The 1820 Kentucky gubernatorial election was held on August 7, 1820.

Acting Democratic-Republican Governor Gabriel Slaughter did not stand for re-election.

Former U.S. Senator John Adair defeated Anthony Butler, Joseph Desha, and William Logan with 32.83% of the vote.

General election

Candidates
John Adair, former U.S. Senator
Anthony Butler, member of the Kentucky House of Representatives
Joseph Desha, former U.S. Representative
William Logan, former U.S. Senator

Withdrawn
John Emmerson

Adair, Butler, Desha and Emmerson represented the pro-relief faction and Logan represented the anti-relief faction.

Results

See also
Old Court – New Court controversy

Notes

References

1820
Kentucky
Gubernatorial